The 1998 Cupa României Final was the 60th final of Romania's most prestigious cup competition. The final was played at the Stadionul Naţional in Bucharest on 6 May 1998 and was contested between Divizia A sides Rapid București and Universitatea Craiova. The cup was won by Rapid.

Route to the final

Match details

References

External links
 Official site 

Cupa Romaniei Final, 1998
Cupa României Finals
1998